Horacio Antonio Tenorio (6 March 1935 – 20 October 2021) was the first general authority in the Church of Jesus Christ of Latter-day Saints (LDS Church) of Mexican ancestry.

Life
Tenorio was born in Mexico City, Mexico. He was trained in business with graduate training in purchasing. He and his wife, Maria, were married in 1957 and are the parents of three children.

In 1969, he 
joined the LDS Church.  He began service as a stake president in 1975.  He later served as a Regional representative and president of the church's Mexico Torreón Mission.

From 1989 until 1994, Tenorio served as a member of the Second Quorum of the Seventy. From 2007 to 2010, he was president of the Monterrey Mexico Temple. He died on October 20, 2021.

Notes

References
2008 Deseret Morning News Church Almanac, p. 100
“Elder Horacio A. Tenorio of the Second Quorum of the Seventy,” Ensign, May 1989, p. 99
Garr, Cannon and Cowan, Encyclopedia of Latter-day Saint History, p. 1240

External links
Grampa Bill's G.A. Pages: Horacio A. Tenorio

1935 births
2021 deaths
Converts to Mormonism
Mexican general authorities (LDS Church)
Mexican Mormon missionaries
Mormon missionaries in Mexico
Members of the Second Quorum of the Seventy (LDS Church)
Mission presidents (LDS Church)
People from Mexico City
Regional representatives of the Twelve
20th-century Mormon missionaries
Temple presidents and matrons (LDS Church)